The 2006 Duke Blue Devils football team represented the Duke University in the 2006 NCAA Division I FBS football season. The team was led by head coach Ted Roof. They played their home games at Wallace Wade Stadium in Durham, North Carolina.

Schedule

References

Duke
Duke Blue Devils football seasons
College football winless seasons
Duke Blue Devils football